Viktoriya Volodymyrivna Malektorovych (born 11 February 1972), known professionally as Victoria Malektorovych, is a Ukrainian actress.

Biography
At the age of 17, Malektorovych studied at the Ukrainian Drama School in Kyiv and then acted at the National Drama Theater of Ukraine there, as well as in Russian and Ukrainian films and series. She also presented radio and television programs. She made her debut as an actress  as Shirley/Jana in the 2022 Austrian feature film Blue Moon.

Honors
At the 3rd International Film Festival "Brigantine" held in Berdyansk in 2000, Malektorovych was honored as the best actress.

Personal life
Malektorovych lives in Kyiv and Vienna, is married to the Austrian producer Klaus Pridnig and is the mother of a son.

Filmography
 2002: Blue Moon
 2006: Mutterglück
 2007: The Debt
 2008: Ein Job
 2011: Lyublyu 9 marta! (Fernsehfilm)
 2012: Blood of War
 2013: SOKO Wien Folge: Schneewitchen
 2013: Luka
 2016: Toni Erdmann

Notes

References

External links
 

1972 births
Living people
People from Yenakiieve
Ukrainian film actresses
Ukrainian television actresses
20th-century Ukrainian actresses
21st-century Ukrainian actresses